The Eastern Sprints is the annual rowing championship for the men's Eastern Association of Rowing Colleges (EARC). (Since 1974, the "Women's Eastern Sprints" has been held as the annual championship for the Eastern Association of Women's Rowing Colleges (EAWRC) league.)

Participants
The teams include all of the Ivy League schools as well as others such as Georgetown University, Syracuse University, U.S. Naval Academy, MIT, BU, Rutgers, Northeastern, and Wisconsin. In the fall of 2006, The George Washington University and The College of the Holy Cross were given a two-year provisional bid to join the league; both schools are now full members of the league.

Since 1981, the Quinsigamond Rowing Association (QRA) has invited the winner of the Worcester City Championships to compete in the varsity eight events at the Eastern Sprints.  The College of the Holy Cross has secured this invitation since 1996.

Location
The race is held at Regatta Point on Lake Quinsigamond in Worcester, MA in mid to late May.  In general, crews compete in a trial heat in the morning, followed by a final (grand, petite, or 3rd level) in the afternoon.  Each race is a 2000m race including up to six crews.

Team cups
Since 1946, the Hoe's Cup has been awarded to the college whose heavyweight men's crews score the highest combined total number of points in the varsity, junior varsity, and freshman races.  Harvard has won the cup the most number of times (27).  Princeton has the 2nd most Rowe Cup victories with 9 (1995, 1996, 1997, 1998, 1999, 2001, 2005, 2015, 2016).

Since 1961, the Jope Cup has been awarded to the college whose lightweight men's crews score the highest combined total number of points in the varsity, junior varsity, and freshman races.  Harvard has won the cup 22 times. Princeton has won 15 times.  The current holder is Yale University.

Since 2009, the Jope Cup has been awarded to the college whose third varsity lightweight men's crew won its race at Eastern Sprints. The Jope Cup is a reward for the third varsity non-Jope Cup qualifying crew that performs the best at the Sprints. It is awarded in secret, given from crew to crew at an undisclosed location. Harvard won the Jope Cup in its inaugural year, 2009. Yale won the cup in 2011, Cornell in 2010,  2012, and 2015. Navy in 2013, and Columbia in 2014. After the third varsity eight became a Jope Cup event for the Kilpatrick Trophy in 2015, the Jope Cup is now passed between fourth varsity eights.

Course records
New event record times were set in the 2007 edition of the regatta.  Harvard now holds the record time in the Varsity Heavyweight event (5:27.005) and Dartmouth holds the Varsity Lightweight event record (5:38.894).

EARC Varsity Heavyweight 8 Winners

Overall ranking

Winners by year

EARC Varsity Lightweight 8 Winners

Overall ranking

|}

Winners by year

See also
National Collegiate Rowing Championship

References

External links
Unofficial historical results from Quinsigamond Rowing Association
Pictures from Eastern Sprints by year

Eastern Association of Rowing Colleges
College rowing competitions in the United States
College sports championships in the United States
Sports competitions in Worcester, Massachusetts
Recurring sporting events established in 1946
Row
Row